"Yesterday Man" is a song written by Chris Andrews and was his first single as a solo singer, released in September 1965. It climbed to No. 3 in the UK Singles Chart, and No. 1 in Ireland, New Zealand, Germany and Austria. In England it sold 20,000 copies in its first day. After a visit to England in September 1965, Jerry Wexler made a deal for Atco Records to release the single in the United States. In the US, it reached  No. 94 in 1966. The Cash Box trade paper reported in its 5 February 1966 issue that it had passed 300,000 sales in Germany alone, and later over 800,000 as a final tally in that country (28 May 1966).

In a contemporary review of the song, the Evening Sentinel wrote how: "Why write hits for Adam and Sandie all the time? says Andrews and sounds quite good on his own", further deeming it to be "Blue-beatish and good." In 2014, Spin included the song in their list of "25 Major Moments in White Reggae History"; in the accompanying write-up, writer Chris Martins deemed it "the birth of White Reggae" and highlighted how the song "made [Andrews'] heart pitter and patter to an island riddim". Mario Villanueva of The Greenville News included the song in a list of twelve exemplary "cod-reggae" songs.

Reggae Mint of UDiscover Music wrote that the "ska-styled solo hit" was a musical predecessor to the Beatles' song "Ob-La-Di, Ob-La-Da" (1968). Andrews' brass-heavy hit was also a partial inspiration for the oom-pah arrangement written by Johnny Marr for the Smiths' song "Frankly Mr. Shankly" (1986).

A German-language version was also recorded. Named "Alles tu Ich Fuer Dich", it was released on the label Deutsche Vogue.

Robert Wyatt version
In 1974, the song was covered by Robert Wyatt (with production by Nick Mason) as the follow-up to his hit with Neil Diamond's "I'm a Believer" (released on  Virgin Records). However, it was never officially released, due to Virgin head Richard Branson deeming the version "a bit too gloomy". In 1992, Wyatt recalled: "I did 'Yesterday Man', a major-key, upbeat, jolly pseudo-reggae thing. I bent all the chords out of shape and did the whole thing kind of sideways. And I was so happy with that. They said, 'We're not putting this out. It's too lugubrious.' I thought, 'That must be good,' but I got a dictionary, and it's not."

According to Wyatt in an interview with Uncut, "We never pretended to be reggae but it was obviously influenced by that feel, which was very much the heartbeat of London around that time." Richard Cook of Mojo deemed the Wyatt version to be "heartbreakingly desolate and a complete antithesis to Chris Andrew's original". Charles Shaar Murray of NME wrote: "Where Andrews' original was aggressively petulant, Wyatt's is wistfully surreal", noting that the musician performs the song "on assorted bits of percussion (including a bass-drum whomped by hand) and what sounds like a harmonium, but plays around the beat while the main rhythmic push comes from Windo and Feza."

Chart history

References

1965 songs
1965 debut singles
Chris Andrews (singer) songs
Number-one singles in Austria
Irish Singles Chart number-one singles
Number-one singles in Germany
Number-one singles in New Zealand
Number-one singles in South Africa
Robert Wyatt songs
Songs written by Chris Andrews (singer)
RPM Top Singles number-one singles
Decca Records singles
Ska songs
British reggae songs